On 1 September 1981, General André Kolingba deposed President David Dacko of the Central African Republic in a bloodless coup while Dacko was away from the country traveling to an official state visit in Libya.  The day after the coup a "Military Committee for National Recovery" (CMRN) was established and was led by Kolingba. The CMRN then suspended the constitution and limited political party activity.

Kolingba's military regime promised to hold election and get rid of corruption but over the next four years corruption increased and the CMRN repeatedly pushed back planned election until 1987. In 1982 the regime survived a coup attempt.

References

1980s coups d'état and coup attempts
Military coups in the Central African Republic
1981 in the Central African Republic
September 1981 events in Africa
Conflicts in 1981